Form is the shape, visual appearance, or configuration of an object. In a wider sense, the form is the way something happens.

Form may also refer to:

Form (document), a document (printed or electronic) with spaces in which to write or enter data
Form (education), a class, set, or group of students
Form (religion), an academic term for prescriptions or norms on religious practice
Form, a shallow depression or flattened nest of grass used by a hare
Form, or rap sheet, slang for a criminal record

People 
 Andrew Form, American film producer
 Fluent Form, Australian rapper and hip hop musician

Arts, entertainment, and media
Form (visual art), a three-dimensional geometrical figure; one of the seven elements of art
Poetic form, a set of structural rules and patterns to which a poem may adhere
Musical form, a generic type of composition or the structure of a particular piece
The Forms (band), an American indie rock band

Computing and technology
Form (computer virus), the most common computer virus of the 1990s
Form (HTML), a document form used on a web page to, typically, submit user data to a server
Form (programming), a component-based representation of a GUI window
FORM (symbolic manipulation system), a program for symbolic computations
Google Forms, cloud-based survey software
Oracle Forms, a Rapid Application Development environment for developing database applications
Windows Forms, the graphical API within the Microsoft .NET Framework for access to native Microsoft Windows interface elements
XForms, an XML format for the specification of user interfaces, specifically web forms
Form Energy, an American energy storage startup company. It is focused on utility-scale iron-air batteries.

Martial arts
Kata (型 or 形), the detailed pattern of defence-and-attack
Taeguk (Taekwondo) (형), the "forms" used to create a foundation for the teaching of Taekwondo
Taolu (套路), forms used in Chinese martial arts and sport wushu

Mathematics
 Algebraic form (homogeneous polynomial), which generalises quadratic forms to degrees 3 and more, also known as quantics or simply forms
 Bilinear form, on a vector space V over a field F is a mapping V × V → F that is linear in both arguments
 Differential form, a concept from differential topology that combines multilinear forms and smooth functions
First-order reliability method, a semi-probabilistic reliability analysis method devised to evaluate the reliability of a system
 Indeterminate form, an algebraic expression that cannot be used to evaluate a limit
 Modular form, a (complex) analytic function on the upper half plane satisfying a certain kind of functional equation and growth condition
 Multilinear form, which generalises bilinear forms to mappings VN → F
 Quadratic form, a homogeneous polynomial of degree two in a number of variables

Philosophy
Argument form,  Logical form or Test form - replacing the different words, or sentences, that make up the argument with letters, along the lines of algebra; the letters represent logical variables
Intelligible form, a substantial form as it is apprehended by the intellect
Substantial form, asserts that ideas organize matter and make it intelligible
Theory of forms, asserts that ideas possess the highest and most fundamental kind of reality
Value-form, an approach to understanding the origins of commodity trade and the formation of markets

Science
Form (botany), a formal taxon at a rank lower than species
Form (zoology), informal taxa used sometimes in zoology
Form, object of study of Morphology
 "-form", a term used in science to describe large groups, often used in taxonomy
 Isoform, several different forms of the same protein

Sports
Form (exercise), a proper way of performing an exercise
Form (horse racing), or racing form, a record of a racehorse's performance
Kata, a choreographed pattern of martial arts movements made to be practised alone

Other uses
 Form (cigarette), a Finnish cigarette brand
 Form, a backless bench formerly used for seating in dining halls, school rooms and courtrooms
 Form, the relation a word has to a lexeme
 Formwork, a mold used for concrete construction

See also
 FORM (disambiguation)
 Conformity (disambiguation)
 Deformation (disambiguation)
 Form factor (disambiguation)
 Formal (disambiguation)
 Formalism (disambiguation)
 Formation (disambiguation)
 Forme (disambiguation)
 Formula (disambiguation)
 Inform (disambiguation)
 Reform (disambiguation)